Endoclita mingiganteus is a species of moth of the family Hepialidae. It is found in China (Fujian).

References

External links
Hepialidae genera

Moths described in 1992
Hepialidae